Stempfferia marginata, the scalloped epitola, is a butterfly in the family Lycaenidae. It is found in Nigeria (south and the Cross River loop), Cameroon, Gabon, the Republic of the Congo, the Central African Republic, the Democratic Republic of the Congo and Uganda. The habitat consists of forests.

References

External links
Seitz, A. Die Gross-Schmetterlinge der Erde 13: Die Afrikanischen Tagfalter. Plate XIII 65 e

Butterflies described in 1887
Poritiinae
Taxa named by William Kirby (entomologist)
Butterflies of Africa